Karwinskia is a genus of flowering plants in the family Rhamnaceae.

Species
 Karwinskia calderonii Standl.
 Karwinskia humboldtiana (Schult.) Zucc.
 Karwinskia johnstonii R.Fernandez
 Karwinskia latifolia Standl.
 Karwinskia mollis Schltdl.
 Karwinskia parvifolia Rose
 Karwinskia rzedowskii R.Fernandez
 Karwinskia subcordata Schltdl.
 Karwinskia umbellata (Cav.) Schltdl.

References

 
Taxa named by Joseph Gerhard Zuccarini
Rhamnaceae genera